Frederik Schuh (7 February 1875, Amsterdam – 6 January 1966, The Hague) was a Dutch mathematician.

Career

He completed his PhD in algebraic geometry from Amsterdam University in 1905, where his advisor was Diederik Johannes Korteweg. He taught at the Technische Hoogeschool at Delft (1907–1909 and 1916–1945) and at Groningen (1909–1916).

Works

He was the inventor of the Chomp game and wrote The Master Book of Mathematical Recreations (1943).

References

External links
 Mathematics Genealogy

1875 births
1966 deaths
20th-century Dutch mathematicians
Game theorists
Scientists from Amsterdam
University of Amsterdam alumni
Academic staff of the Delft University of Technology
Academic staff of the University of Groningen